Roche de Smet is a  mountain summit located in the Athabasca River valley of Jasper National Park in Alberta, Canada. It is situated in the De Smet Range of the Canadian Rockies. It was named in 1896 after Pierre-Jean De Smet.

Climate

Based on the Köppen climate classification, Roche de Smet is located in a subarctic climate with cold, snowy winters, and mild summers.

See also
Geology of the Rocky Mountains

References

Gallery

Two-thousanders of Alberta
Mountains of Jasper National Park
Canadian Rockies